Juan Francisco Martínez Modesto (born 10 June 1980), known as Nino, is a Spanish former professional footballer who played as a striker, currently assistant manager of Elche CF Ilicitano.

Over 14 seasons, he amassed Segunda División totals of 571 matches and 194 goals, mainly with Elche. In La Liga, he represented Levante, Tenerife, Osasuna and Elche.

Club career
An extremely prolific goalscorer in Segunda División, Nino was born in Vera, Province of Almería, and first appeared professionally with Elche CF, helping the club achieve promotion from the Segunda División B in 1998–99. In the following campaign he made his debut in division two, with 16 matches and two goals, and would go on to develop as an influential figure for the Alicante province team.

After having scored 20 goals during 2004–05, Nino made his La Liga debut two seasons later, joining neighbours Levante UD. However, he would only find the net once throughout the entire campaign, in a 2–1 loss at CA Osasuna on 20 December 2006, but the Valencians managed to avoid relegation after finishing in 15th position.

Nino returned to the second tier in 2007–08, loaned to CD Tenerife, and finished the campaign with 18 goals, second best in the league behind Xerez CD's Yordi. The move was made permanent afterwards, on a three-year deal.

In 2008–09, Nino was finally crowned the second division's top scorer at 29 goals and Tenerife returned to the top flight after a seven-year hiatus. In the next season, he was again their main attacking reference: on 18 April 2010 he scored a hat-trick at home against Getafe CF (3–2), totalling 14 at the end of the season but in an eventual relegation. He bettered to 17 the following campaign, but the Canary Islands side dropped down another league.

Nino rejoined the top flight in early July 2011, with the 31-year-old signing a 2+1 contract with Osasuna. He netted in only his second official game, a 2–1 home win over Sporting de Gijón.

On 19 August 2016, after the Navarrese were promoted back into the main division, Nino remained in the second one with Elche, rejoining the club a decade after leaving. He scored 12 times in his first season back at the Estadio Manuel Martínez Valero, including two in a 4–4 draw with Gimnàstic de Tarragona on 8 October, but his team was relegated.

On 3 January 2021, at the age of 40, Nino competed in Elche's 1–0 La Liga away defeat to Athletic Bilbao. In doing so, he became the first player to reach 700 games in Spain's two professional divisions.

Nino announced his retirement from professional football on 9 June 2021, one day shy of his 41st birthday. On 2 September, he was named assistant manager of René Martínez at his last club's reserves.

Career statistics

Honours
Pichichi Trophy (Segunda División): 2008–09 
Zarra Trophy (Segunda División): 2008–09

References

External links

1980 births
Living people
Sportspeople from the Province of Almería
Spanish footballers
Footballers from Andalusia
Association football forwards
La Liga players
Segunda División players
Segunda División B players
Elche CF Ilicitano footballers
Elche CF players
Levante UD footballers
CD Tenerife players
CA Osasuna players